"In a Little While" is a song by American singer-songwriter Uncle Kracker from his second album, No Stranger to Shame (2002). It was released as a single on August 12, 2002, and peaked at number 59 on the US Billboard Hot 100. The single also reached number 26 on the Adult Contemporary chart.

Music video

The music video was directed by Nick Quested and premiered the week of August 26, 2002. American singer-songwriter Willa Ford makes an appearance.

Track listing
European and Australian maxi-CD single
 "In a Little While" (radio edit) – 3:59
 "In a Little While" (album version) – 4:10
 "I Don't Know" (remix) – 3:54

Charts

Release history

References

2002 singles
2002 songs
Lava Records singles
Songs written by Michael Bradford
Songs written by Uncle Kracker
Uncle Kracker songs